Golyam Kupen is a peak rising to 1,930 m in Vitosha Mountain, Bulgaria.  The peak is situated on the southern border of Bistrishko Branishte Biosphere Reserve, on the watershed  between Vitoshka Bistritsa to the north and Selska Reka (‘Village River’) to the south, rivers flowing eastwards to the villages of Bistritsa and Zheleznitsa respectively, and eventually to Iskar River.

Golyam Rezen is accessible by tracks coming from Golyam Rezen Peak in the northwest; from Aleko Centre via the upper Bistrishko Branishte; and from Zheleznitsa Village in the east-southeast.  Fizkulturnik Chalet is situated in the southern foothills of the peak, overlooking Kazana (‘Cauldron’) site.

See also

 Bistrishko Branishte
 Vitosha

References
 Summit Post: Vitosha
 Vitosha Nature Park. Website.
 Zone Bulgaria: Vitosha
 Vitosha Map.

Vitosha
Landforms of Sofia City Province
Mountains of Bulgaria

pl:Golam Kupen (Witosza)